Nival is a Russian video game developer and publisher founded by Sergey Orlovskiy in 1996. It is headquartered in Limassol, Cyprus, with development offices in St. Petersburg and Moscow, Russia.

History
The company was founded by Sergey Orlovskiy on November 18, 1996 as Nival Interactive, and became famous as the developer of several successful role-playing and strategy series, including Rage of Mages (known as Allods in Russia), Blitzkrieg, and Etherlords, all of which would receive sequels. Nival also created the Silent Storm engine and developed several games using it, beginning with the eponymous Silent Storm series in 2003. Among these was Heroes of Might and Magic V and two add-ons, published by Ubisoft.

Nival began to self-publish its own games in 2005. Nival financed and published external developers including KranX Productions, creators of King's Bounty: Legions and Bytex, developers of Berserk Online. In early 2005, the part of Nival operating under the name Nival Interactive was bought by Ener1 Group, a Florida-based holdings company, for around $10 million. On November 30, 2007, Sergey Orlovskiy regained full control of Nival Interactive.

In early 2010, another part of Nival, Astrum Nival, was bought by the largest Russian portal Mail.Ru for more than $100 million, becoming a part of Astrum Online Entertainment. Nival's internal development studios became focused on PC and mobile projects. In 2011, Nival Interactive was merged with Nival Network into a new company, called just Nival. Nival has developed and launched Prime World, King's Bounty: Legions and has several projects in development.

In December 2013, Nival raised $6 million in its Series A funding round led by Almaz Capital. The funds were to be used for global expansion. In February 2017, Nival announced the world's first Neural Network AI for its game Blitzkrieg 3.

Games
Rage of Mages (1998) 
Rage of Mages II: Necromancer (1999)
Evil Islands: Curse of the Lost Soul (2001)
Etherlords (2001)
Etherlords II (2003)
Etherlords (2014)
Blitzkrieg (2003)
Blitzkrieg 2 (2005)
Blitzkrieg 3 (2017)
Silent Storm (2003)
Silent Storm: Sentinels (2004)
Hammer & Sickle (2005)
Hard Truck Apocalypse (2005)
Night Watch (2005)
Heroes of Might and Magic V (2006)
Heroes of Might and Magic V: Hammers of Fate (2006)
Heroes of Might and Magic V: Tribes of the East (2007)
Allods Online (2010)
King's Bounty: Legions (2011)
Emaki (2012)
Prime World (2012)
Prime World: Alchemy (December 2012)
Prime World: Defenders (2013)
Prime World: Defenders 2 (2015)

References

External links

 Official website

Companies based in Saint Petersburg
Russian companies established in 1996
Video game companies established in 1996
Video game companies of Russia
Video game development companies
Video game publishers
Privately held companies of Russia